Rui António Loja Fernandes (July 20, 1965, Coimbra) is a Portuguese mathematician working in the USA.

Education and career 
Fernandes obtained a bachelor's degree in Physics Engineering at Instituto Superior Técnico (Lisbon, Portugal) in 1988. He then moved to the USA and earned a master's degree in Mathematics in 1991 and a PhD in Mathematics in 1994 from the University of Minnesota. His PhD thesis was entitled "Completely Integrable bi-Hamiltonian Systems" and has been written under the supervision of Peter J. Olver. 

In 1994 he returned to Instituto Superior Técnico, where he worked first as Assistant Professor (1994-2002), and then as Associated Professor (2003-2007) and Full Professor (2007-2012).

In 2012 he moved back to the USA and since then he is the Lois M. Lackner Professor of Mathematics at University of Illinois at Urbana–Champaign. In 2016, he became a Fellow of the American Mathematical Society "for contributions to the study of Poisson geometry and Lie algebroids, and for service to the mathematical community."

Research 
Fernandes research focusses on differential geometry, more precisely on Poisson and symplectic geometry. Among his most well-known results are a solution to the long-standing problem of describing the obstructions to the integrability of Lie algebroids and a new geometric proof of Conn's linearization theorem, both written in collaboration with Marius Crainic.

He is the author of more than 40 research papers in peer-reviewed journals and has supervised 6 PhD students as of 2021.

References

External links

1965 births
Living people
People from Coimbra
Instituto Superior Técnico alumni
University of Illinois faculty
20th-century Portuguese mathematicians
University of Minnesota College of Liberal Arts alumni
University of Illinois Urbana-Champaign faculty
Fellows of the American Mathematical Society
21st-century Portuguese mathematicians